August Cönders was a German engineer working for Röchling'sche Eisen und Stahlwerke GmbH during World War II after having worked in the UK and in Putaux, France, before the war.

He designed the Röchling shell that was  tested in 1942 and 1943 against the Belgian Fort d'Aubin-Neufchâteau and the V-3 cannon. Very little is known of his life after the V-3 project.

References

External links
 August Coenders' 9x19mm Belt-Fed MG

Engineers from Saarland
Weapon designers
Possibly living people
Year of birth missing